Phthia (lived 4th century BC), was a Greek queen, daughter of Menon of Pharsalus, the Thessalian hipparch, and wife of Aeacides, king of Epirus, by whom she became the mother of the celebrated Pyrrhus, as well as of two daughters: Deidamia, the wife of Demetrius Poliorcetes, and Troias, of whom nothing more is known. 

Her portrait is found on some of the coins of her son Pyrrhus.

Another bearer of the name was her great-granddaughter, Phthia of Macedon.

References
Smith, William (editor); Dictionary of Greek and Roman Biography and Mythology, "Phthia (1)", Boston, (1867)

Notes

Ancient Epirote queens consort
Ancient Thessalian women
4th-century BC Greek people
4th-century BC Greek women
Pyrrhus of Epirus